In mathematics, Oka's lemma, proved by Kiyoshi Oka, states that in a domain of holomorphy in , the function  is plurisubharmonic, where  is the distance to the boundary. This property shows that the domain is pseudoconvex. Historically, this lemma was first shown in the Hartogs domain in the case of two variables, also Oka's lemma is the inverse of the Levi's problem (unramified Riemann domain over ). So maybe that's why Oka called Levi's problem as "problème inverse de Hartogs", and the Levi's problem is occasionally called Hartogs' Inverse Problem.

References

Further reading 

 PDF TeX

Theorems in complex analysis
Lemmas in analysis